Håkan Persson  is a Swedish music journalist, born in Stockholm, 1 June. He has been the host and producer of P3 Rock, a radio show on P3, Sveriges Radio, since 1996. He started doing radio in 1981, with the punk show Ny Våg. Later he's been presenting radio shows like: änubah!, Inferno, Slammer and Musikjournalen.

External links
 P3 Rock Homepage 

20th-century Swedish journalists
Year of birth missing (living people)
Living people
Journalists from Stockholm